The 2014–15 Duquesne Dukes women's basketball team represented Duquesne University during the 2014–15 college basketball season. Dan Burt resumed the responsibility as head coach for a 2nd consecutive season. The Dukes are members of the Atlantic 10 Conference and played their home games at the A. J. Palumbo Center. They finished the season 23–11, 12–4 in A-10 play to finish in third place. They advanced to the semifinals of the A-10 women's tournament where they lost to Dayton. They were invited to the Women's National Invitation Tournament where they defeated Youngstown State in the first round, Richmond in the second round before losing to West Virginia in the third round.

2014–15 media

Duquesne Dukes Sports Network
All Duquesne Dukes home games and select road games will be broadcast by Red Zone Media with Alex Panormios and Tad Maurey providing the call. Road games not done by Red Zone Media can usually be heard on the home teams radio feed. Most home games will also be featured on the A-10 Digital Network. Select games will be televised.

2014–15 Roster

Schedule

|-
!colspan=9 style="background:#CC0000; color:#00214D;"| Regular Season

|-
!colspan=9 style="background:#00214D; color:#CC0000;"| Atlantic 10 Tournament

|-
!colspan=9 style="background:#00214D; color:#CC0000;"| WNIT

Rankings
2014–15 NCAA Division I women's basketball rankings

See also
 2014–15 Duquesne Dukes men's basketball team
 Duquesne Dukes women's basketball

References

Duquesne Dukes women's basketball seasons
Duquesne